Kenan Pars (born Kirkor Cezveciyan; 10 March 1920 – 10 March 2008) was a Turkish-Armenian actor. He appeared in more than one hundred films from 1953 to 2000.

Selected filmography

References

External links 

1920 births
2008 deaths
Turkish male film actors
Male actors from Istanbul
Turkish people of Armenian descent